Inés Sastre Moratón (born 21 November 1973) is a Spanish model and actress.

Early life
Born in Valladolid, Sastre's career started at the age of 12, when she was selected for a fast-food commercial with McDonald's. Her first movie appearance occurred in 1988 in El Dorado by Carlos Saura. In 1989, she was awarded the Look of the Year by the Elite Model Agency group. At that point in her life she was offered a career in modelling but she chose to continue her studies instead.

She studied at The Sorbonne in Paris, and in addition to Spanish, she speaks French, English and Italian fluently. In 1996, Sastre succeeded Isabella Rossellini as Lancôme's spokesmodel for its perfume, Trésor.

In 1997, before playing the role of Francesca Babini in Italian director Pupi Avati's movie Il testimone dello sposo, she became the Beauté Naturelle for having won the Prix de la mode in Paris' Fashion Awards. The following years saw her work with UNESCO and take part in a multitude of fashion design shows, and also taking part in numerous ads.

In 2000, Sastre achieved popularity in Italy as a presenter with Fabio Fazio at the  Italian Music Festival di Sanremo.

Sastre married Alexandro Corrias in 2006 and together they had a son, Diego. A little over a year later they mutually filed for divorce. 

Sastre is a UNICEF ambassador.

She enjoys golf and has played in the Gary Player Invitational charity pro-am several times in South Africa to help raise funds for needy children.

Magazine covers
Ines has also appeared on many international magazine front covers, just to name a few:

 ¡Hola!
 Blanco y Negro (Spain)
 Cosmopolitan
 Elle
 ES
 Femme
 GQ
 Linea
 Luna (Germany)
 Marie Claire
 Red (UK)
 Rolling Stone
 Telva
 Vogue
 Woman

Filmography

 1988 El Dorado
 1988 Joan of Arc of Mongolia
 1990 Fuga dal paradiso
 1995 Beyond the Clouds
 1995 Faire un film pour moi c'est vivre (documentary)
 1995 Sabrina
 1997 The Best Man
 1998 The Count of Monte Cristo
 1999 Un amor de Borges
 2001 Druids
 2001 Torrente 2: Misión en Marbella
 2001 Vidocq
 2003 Io No
 2003 Volpone
 2003 Variaciones 1/113
 2005 The Lost City
 2007 A Dinner for Them to Meet

Honours 
 Dame (“Chevalier”) of the Ordre des Arts et des Lettres (21/11/2013).

See also
 Castilian people
 Judit Mascó
 Natalia Estrada
 Ana Alvarez
 Almudena Fernandez

References

External links 

 
 Inés Sastre at ECI (Entertainment Creative Interface) Global Talent Management

1973 births
20th-century Spanish actresses
21st-century Spanish actresses
Chevaliers of the Ordre des Arts et des Lettres
Living people
People from Valladolid
Spanish female models
Spanish film actresses
People named in the Paradise Papers